= Klipriviersberg Estate =

- Location within Gauteng Location within South Africa
- Coordinates: 26.244°S 28.089°E
- Country: South Africa
- Province: Gauteng
- Municipality: City of Johannesburg
- Main Place: Johannesburg

Area
  - Total: 0.22 km^{2} (0.085 sq mi)

Population (2011)
  - Total: 1,374
  - Density: 6,200/km^{2} (16,000/sq mi)

Racial makeup (2011)
  - Black African: 23.3%
  - Coloured: 38.4%
  - Indian/Asian: 0.6%
  - White: 37.7%

First languages (2011)
  - Afrikaans: 50.5%
  - English: 26.7%
  - Zulu: 6.5%
  - Xhosa: 6.0%
  - Other: 10.3%
- Time zone: UTC+2 (SAST)

Klipriviersberg Estate is a suburb of Johannesburg, South Africa. It is located in Region F of the City of Johannesburg Metropolitan Municipality.
